Bambang, officially the Municipality of Bambang, is a 1st class municipality in the province of Nueva Vizcaya, Philippines. According to the 2020 census, it has a population of 55,789 people.

The municipality is known for its salt springs at the Salinas Natural Monument.

Etymology
The name "Bambang" is an Isinay word meaning "to dig".

History
Originally these places were inhabited by the Igorot and Panuypuyes (Aritao), the Ilongots (Dupax and Bambang), and the lgorot in the area west from the present native population of Dupax, Aritao, and Bambang came about by the inter-marriages of the tribes mentioned above.

Development and progress
In 2012, Bambang became open to big dealers and businessmen as part of its progress. Now the town has its own newly opened fast food chains and other marketing establishments.

Geography

Barangays
Bambang is politically subdivided into 25 barangays. These barangays are headed by elected officials: Barangay Captain, Barangay Council, whose members are called Barangay Councilors. All are elected every three years.

Climate

Demographics

Economy

Culture
Panggayjaya festival, which is celebrated from late April to May yearly. Part of its celebration is the annual Miss Panggayjaya (Bambang) and the counterpart Mister Bambang which started in 2016. Along with the celebration of its patron, Saint Catherine of Siena.

Tourism
On April 23, 2000, then President Joseph Ejercito Estrada issued a proclamation that declared Salinas Forest Reserve and Deer Refuge in the Municipality of Bambang, including two municipalities in the Province of Nueva Vizcaya, as a protected area pursuant to Republic Act No. 7589 and shall be known as Salinas Natural Monument. As of now, Salinas Natural Monument has yet to be developed as a tourist destination.

The Municipality of Bambang has a lot of tourist spots like the Salinas Salt Spring, Manamtam Salt Spring, Manamtam River, Laguerta Falls, Abian Falls, Pallas Cave, the Bambang Cross, and the Bambang Agri Tourism Learning Site.

Recently, the Municipality of Bambang successfully launched "Paskuhan sa Bambang."

Government and Politics

Bambang, belonging to the lone congressional district of the province of Nueva Vizcaya, is governed by a mayor designated as its local chief executive and by a municipal council as its legislative body in accordance with the Local Government Code. The mayor, vice mayor, and councilors are elected directly by the people through an election that is held every three years.

Elected officials

Former Mayors of Bambang
Luisa Lloren Cuaresma: 1989–1998
Dr. Pepito D. Balgos M.d.: 1998–2007
Benjamin L.Cuaresma III: 2007–2010
Atty. Flaviano D. Balgos, Jr.: 2010–2019
Dr. Pepito D. Balgos M.d.: 2019–2022

Education

The Schools Division of Nueva Vizcaya governs the town's public education system. The division office is a field office of the DepEd in Cagayan Valley region. The office governs the public and private elementary and public and private high schools throughout the municipality.

Primary and Elementary Schools
 Abinganan Elementary School
 Abian Elementary School
 Aliaga Elementary School
 Aliaga Annex Primary School
 Almaguer North Elementary School
 Almaguer South Elementary School
 Bambang West Elementary School
 Bambang Central School
 Bambang North Central School
 Bambang East Elementary School
 Barat Elementary School
 Dullao Elementary School
 Indiana Elementary School
 Labni Elementary School
 Mabuslo Elementary School
 Macate Elementary School
 Mauan Elementary School
 Nangcalapan Primary School
 Pallas Elementary School
 Salinas Elementary School
 Salicpan Elementary School
 San Antonio South Elementary School
 San Antonio North Elementary School
 San Fernando Elementary School
 San Leonardo Elementary School
 Sto. Nino Primary School
 Kiddie Kingdom International School
 Saint Catherine's School
 California Academy
 Aurora Christian School Foundation
 Camella SNV Montessori School

High Schools and Senior High Schools
 King's College of the Philippines (formerly: Eastern Luzon Colleges)
 Saint Catherine's School
 Bambang National High School
 Salinas High School
 Sto. Domingo Integrated School

Colleges and Universities
 King's College of the Philippines (formerly: Eastern Luzon Colleges)
 Nueva Vizcaya State University
 Advocates College

Gallery

References

External links

[ Philippine Standard Geographic Code]
Philippine Census Information

Local Governance Performance Management System

Municipalities of Nueva Vizcaya